The 2020–21 USC Trojans men's basketball team represented the University of Southern California during the 2020–21 NCAA Division I men's basketball season. Led by eighth-year head coach Andy Enfield, they played their home games at the Galen Center in Los Angeles, California as members of the Pac-12 Conference.  They finished the season 25-8, 15-5 in Pac-12 Play to finish in 2nd place. They defeated Utah in the quarterfinals of the Pac-12 tournament before losing in the semifinals to Colorado. They received an at-large bid to the NCAA tournament where they defeated Drake, Kansas, and Oregon to advance to the Elite Eight where they lost to Gonzaga.

Previous season

The 2019–20 USC Trojans ended the season at 22–9 overall, and a 11-7 Conference record for a tie for 3rd Place with Arizona State. They were set to take on Arizona in the quarterfinals of the Pac-12 tournament. However, the remainder of the Pac-12 Tournament, and all other postseason tournaments, were cancelled amid the COVID-19 pandemic.

Off-season

Departures

Incoming transfers

2020 recruiting class

2021 Recruiting class

Roster

Team Recognition
Andy Enfield
John R. Wooden Pac-12 Coach of the Year
Naismith Trophy Men's Coach of the Year Late Season Watch List
Evan Mobley
Pac-12 Player of the Year
Pac-12 Freshman of the Year
Pac-12 Defensive Player of the Year
All-Pac-12 First Team
Pac-12 All-Freshman Team
Pac-12 All-Defensive Team
Pac-12 Freshman of the Week (Week 2, Week 3, Week 7, Week 9, Week 11, Week 13)
Pac-12 Men's Basketball Preseason Media First Team All-Conference 
Wooden Award Preseason Top 50 Watch List
Wooden Award Midseason Top 25 Watch List
Wooden Award Late Season Top 20 Watch List
NABC Player Of The Year Watch List
Naismith Trophy Watch List
Naismith Defensive Play of the Year Award Watch List
Naismith Player of the Week (Week 13)
Naismith National Player of the Year Semifinalist
Kareem Abdul-Jabbar Award Watch List
Kareem Abdul-Jabbar Award Top 10 Finalist
NCAA Player of the Week
Pac-12 Player of the Week (Week 11) - 2nd player in the conference, after Onyeka Okongwu, to ever be recognized as player of the week and freshman of the week during the same week.
Tahj Eaddy
All-Pac-12 Second Team

Injuries
E. Anderson wasn't available for the UConn game due to back spasms. He remained on the sidelines until his return on January 14, 2021 against Washington.

Schedule and results

|-
!colspan=9 style=| Regular season

|-
!colspan=9 style=| Pac-12 Tournament

|-
!colspan=9 style=| NCAA tournament

Rankings

Note: AP does not release post-tournament rankings
^ Coaches did not release a Week 1 poll.

References

USC Trojans men's basketball seasons
Usc
USC Trojans basketball, men
USC Trojans basketball, men
USC Trojans basketball, men
USC Trojans basketball, men
USC